St. Xavier's School, Rohini is a private Catholic primary and secondary school located in Shahbad Daulatpur, Sector 26, Rohini, Delhi, India. Established in 1966 and managed by the Jesuits since 1990, the Christian-minority English medium school is coeducational and recognized by the Board of Education Delhi Administration and is affiliated to the Central Board of Secondary Education (CBSE), with science, commerce, and humanities streams.

History
The school at Shahbad Daulatpur, Rohini, Delhi, was started in 1972. The Jesuits took over the management of the school in 1990, when it became affiliated with St. Xavier's Senior Secondary School, Delhi. The new building was completed on 1 May 1998 and the school has grown to include close to 4,000 students. The Rohini campus includes a junior school, vocational training, and a National Institute of Open Schooling (afternoon tutorial). The Loyola Vocational Institute is mainly for high school dropouts and has eight hundred students; remedial tutorial classes are held for children attending local government schools. The school was graded an "A star institution" by the Times News Network. It enjoys the administrative assistance of the Congregation of Jesus (CJ) sisters since 2006.

Activities 
These include Student's Council, excursions, eco club, inter-house competitions, yoga, annual day, theatre club, sports day, inter-school competitions, parents day, and other celebrations. The school uses the house system where houses compete for points and each January activities culminate with a sports day where a trophy is awarded to the winning house.

Facilities include: grass playing fields, gymnasium, activities and yoga room, audio-visual room, auditorium, music room, and labs for science, computers, mathematics, and English language.

See also

 List of Jesuit schools
 List of schools in India
 Violence against Christians in India

References 

Jesuit primary schools in India
Jesuit secondary schools in India
Christian schools in Delhi
Private schools in Delhi
Educational institutions established in 1966
1966 establishments in India